Harjinder Singh Dhami (born 28 August 1956) is a Sikh lawyer who has been serving as the 30th president of Shiromani Gurdwara Parbandhak Committee since 2021. He has been a member of Shiromani Gurdwara Parbandhak Committee for Sham Churasi in Hoshiarpur since 1996.

References

1956 births
Living people
People from Hoshiarpur district